Stanley: The Search for Dr. Livingston (after "David Livingstone") is a side-scrolling action-adventure game for the Nintendo Entertainment System that appeared in one of the first 50 issues of Nintendo Power magazine.

Summary

The video game takes place in the "deepest and darkest" part of Africa during the year 1871. Nations were sending their explorers to uncover the last remaining continent that was not fully mapped by the European superpowers. Dr. Livingston abandoned his original quest to uncover the temple of Am-Zutuk; who was worshipped as a god amongst the indigenous African people. The magic inside this temple is believed to grant its founder amazing wisdom and power. Ghosts and demons haunt the temple making it a tricky venture for any explorer.

The player, as reporter Henry Morton Stanley (after Sir Stanley, 1841-1904), is exploring the last of the mysterious jungle regions for European colonization when his professor, Dr. Livingston (patterned after Dr. David Livingstone, with an ending "e"), gets kidnapped by some African tribesmen. Now the player must explore one of the last uncharted parts of Africa to save his mentor and end an era of exploring Africa. The player is automatically equipped with a gyrocopter to make those tricky landings much smoother.

One of the mentioned places in Africa is Port Harken, which appears as an important "town" level in the game.

References

1992 video games
Electro Brain games
Nintendo Entertainment System games
Nintendo Entertainment System-only games
North America-exclusive video games
Side-scrolling video games
Video games set in the 19th century
Video games set in Africa
Video games based on real people
Video games developed in the United States
Cultural depictions of David Livingstone
Cultural depictions of Henry Morton Stanley
Single-player video games

Action-adventure games